Wellisch is a surname. Notable people with the surname include:

Adolpho Wellisch (1886–1972), Brazilian diver
Christian Wellisch (born 1975), Hungarian-American professional mixed martial artist
Hans Wellisch (1920–2004), Austrian-American indexer and LIS educator

See also
Wallisch